Allan Morris is an Australian politician.

Allan Morris may also refer to:

Allan Morris (Canadian football)

See also

Allan Pollok-Morris, British documentary photographer	
Alan Morris (disambiguation)
Allen Morris (disambiguation)